Thierry Sardo is the former head coach of the New Caledonia national football team.

Managerial statistics

References

Living people
New Caledonia national football team managers
Year of birth missing (living people)
Place of birth missing (living people)
New Caledonian football managers